First Flight is a 2006 computer-animated comedy short film produced by DreamWorks Animation. It was written and directed by Cameron Hood and Kyle Jefferson.

The short debuted on March 12, 2006, at the South by Southwest Festival in Austin, Texas. Theatrically it was released on May 19, 2006, in select New York and Los Angeles theatres, together with the film Over the Hedge.

Plot 
The film tells the story of a fastidiously organized businessman, whose perspective on life is forever changed through an unexpected encounter with a tiny fledgling bird.

Cast
 Jeanine Meyers as Bird
 Jon Spinogatti as Swift/Bus Driver

Home media
First Flight is a Special Feature on the Madly Madagascar DVD along with Hammy's Boomerang Adventure, an Over the Hedge short film.
First Flight is a Special Feature on the Over the Hedge Blu-ray Disc along with Hammy's Boomerang Adventure, as previously said, an Over the Hedge short film.

Notes

References

External links
 
 

2006 films
2006 computer-animated films
Animated films without speech
2000s American animated films
2000s animated short films
Computer-animated short films
DreamWorks Animation animated short films
Paramount Pictures animated films
Paramount Pictures short films
American animated short films
Animated films about birds
American aviation films
Animated films about animals
Films scored by James Dooley
2000s English-language films